Sheila Guijarro Gómez (born 26 September 1996) is a Spanish footballer who plays as a forward for Villarreal.

Club career
Guijarro started her career at Levante.

References

External links
Profile at La Liga

1996 births
Living people
Women's association football forwards
Spanish women's footballers
Footballers from Valencia (city)
Levante UD Femenino players
Málaga CF Femenino players
Villarreal CF (women) players
Primera División (women) players
Segunda Federación (women) players